
Gmina Hanna is a rural gmina (administrative district) in Włodawa County, Lublin Voivodeship, in eastern Poland, on the border with Belarus and close to Ukraine.

Villages
Gmina Hanna contains the villages and settlements of Dańce, Dołhobrody, Hanna, Holeszów, Holeszów PGR, Janówka, Konstantyn, Kuzawka, Lack, Nowy Holeszów, Pawluki and Zaświatycze.

Neighbouring gminas
Gmina Hanna is bordered by the gminas of Sławatycze, Sosnówka, Tuczna, Włodawa and Wyryki. It also borders Belarus.

References
 Polish official population figures 2006

Hanna
Włodawa County